Bernice Ofei is a Ghanaian award-winning gospel artist. She won Best Female Vocal Performance and Songwriter of the Year at the 2009 Vodafone Ghana Music Awards.

Discography
Bernice Offei has 6 albums to her credit, the 6th of which she recorded in 2007 titled "life". Which won her two awards during the 10th edition of the MTN Ghana Music Awards as the Best Vocal Female Performer and the Song Writer of the year.

Career
Bernice is a Banker by profession and has been working with the Standard Chartered Bank.

Studio albums

Education
Bernice had her secondary education at Achimota School in Accra, Ghana. She holds an MPhil in crop science from the University of Ghana and an MSc in Information technology from the United Kingdom. She is popularly known for her hit songs “Hold On” and “Life is so short”.

Personal life 
She is married to Prof. Samuel Kwame Offei (Pro-Vice Chancellor of University of Ghana) and a mother of two.

References

University of Ghana alumni
Alumni of Achimota School
Living people
Year of birth missing (living people)
Ghanaian gospel singers
Ghanaian women singers
Ghanaian women musicians